The Grand Hotel Heiligendamm is a luxury hotel and gated community in Heiligendamm on the Mecklenburg Baltic coast in Germany. 

The five-star grand hotel is counted among the best hotels in Germany. The hotel was the first seaside resort in Germany and was founded in 1793 by the then ruler Friedrich Franz I.

The operator is Grand Resort Heiligendamm GmbH & Co. KG. The Hotel was formerly managed by the Kempinski hotel group.

History
The current hotel was founded in 1793 by Friedrich Franz I, Duke of Mecklenburg-Schwerin, as the first German seaside resort. In the hotel stayed among others Rainer Maria Rilke, Felix Mendelssohn Bartholdy, Queen Luise of Prussia, Nicholas I of Russia, later Adolf Hitler and Benito Mussolini.

The ground of the hotel complex belonged to the chamber property of the respective dukes or grand dukes of Mecklenburg and Mecklenburg-Schwerin from 1793 to 1873. Grand Duke Friedrich Franz II sold most of the baths to Otto von Kahlden in 1873. Von Kahlden had founded a stock corporation for the property, but then acquired the majority of the shares himself and thus became the sole owner.

Under von Kahlden, the "Grand Hotel" was built, which later gave its name. After Otto von Kahlden's death, his son Rudolf von Kahlden took over. He sold the hotel to Walter John in 1911, who went bankrupt that same year. A consortium of the major creditors bought the hotel to save their mortgage. The consortium continued to operate the plant in the form of a GmbH. As a result of the World War I and the following inflation, the GmbH ran into difficulties and the Louis Wolff KG bank, as the majority shareholder, became insolvent.

In 1925, Oskar Adolf von Rosenberg bought the Louis Wolff banking house and thus became the owner of the facility in Heiligendamm. The daily business were still operated by Ostseebad Heiligendamm GmbH, so that the property of the Jewish-born Rosenberg was also visited by nazi promints, including Adolf Hitler himself and their guests, such as Benito Mussolini. For ideological reasons, the bath was expropriated from its Jewish owner in 1932 and converted into the so-called Kraft durch Freude-facility.

After the World War II, Heiligendamm continued to be a spa. From 1949 to 1990 the Grand Hotel was the main part of the sanatorium for working people. In 1990 the sanatorium became the Ostseeklinik Heiligendamm. The Treuhandanstalt sold the package of 26 houses to the Median Clinic Group at the end of 1997. The real estate went to the Fundus Group.

In 1996, Fundus Group of real estate entrepreneur Anno August Jagdfeld acquired the facility and renovated the building and hotel. From 2000 on he renovated the building. Of the 200 million euros for the renovation, 50 million euros came in subsidies from public funds and were intended to create jobs. The newly renovated hotel opened in 2003, managed by the Kempinski Group. At the beginning of 2007 the five-star hotel was included in the exclusive group of Leading Hotels of the World. 

"In terms of image, the hotel was at its zenith“ thanks to its strong media presence as the location of the G8 summit in 2007. As a result, thousands of anticapitalist activists blocked the roads to Heiligendamm and an estimated 25,000 anti-globalization protesters demonstrated in nearby Rostock; the protesters had little effect on the leaders of the top industrialized nations because they could not get close enough to the building.

In February 2009, Kempinski terminated the operating contract after disputes with the owner Jagdfeld. In 2012, the Fundus Fond, which owned the hotel, filed for bankruptcy. The fund's investors lost a lot of money. In 2013 Fundus was sold to the entrepreneur Paul Morzynski from Hanover.  
Since 2020 am Adlon Golf & Country Club has been built around the hotel. The resulting extensive gated community corresponds to the ideas of the hotel manager Anno August Jagdfeld, who was bothered by the strollers and cyclists on the premises.

Hotel
The complex consists of six buildings which were all built as a seaside resort between 1793 and 1870. It is renowned to be the first example of resort architecture. The main building (Haus Grandhotel) was built in 1814 and reopened on June 1, 2003 after three years of revitalisation work.

See also
 List of G8 summit resorts
 List of hotels in Germany

Notes

References
 Bekker, Henk. (2005).  Adventure Guide Germany. Edison, New Jersey: Hunter Publishing.  ;  OCLC 59138570

External links

Grand Hotel Heiligendamm
History

Hotels in Germany
Hotel and leisure companies of Germany
Buildings and structures in Rostock (district)
Commercial buildings completed in 1814
Commercial buildings completed in 1870
Hotels established in 1814
1814 establishments in Germany